Psychrobacter okhotskensis is a Gram-negative, catalase- and oxidase-positive, aerobic, facultatively psychrophilic, nonmotile bacterium of the genus  Psychrobacter, which was isolated from seawater of the Monbetsu coast of the Okhotsk Sea in Hokkaido in Japan.

References

External links
Type strain of Psychrobacter okhotskensis at BacDive -  the Bacterial Diversity Metadatabase

Moraxellaceae
Bacteria described in 2003
Psychrophiles